Seh Boneh-ye Olya (also Romanized as Seh Boneh-ye ‘Olyā; also known as Seh Boneh and Seh Boneh-ye Bālā) is a village in Miyan Ab-e Shomali Rural District, in the Central District of Shushtar County, Khuzestan Province, Iran. At the 2006 census, its population was 49, in 8 families.

References 

Populated places in Shushtar County